The 1937 Indiana Hoosiers football team represented the Indiana Hoosiers in the 1937 Big Ten Conference football season. The Hoosiers played their home games at Memorial Stadium in Bloomington, Indiana. The team was coached by Bo McMillin, in his fourth year as head coach of the Hoosiers. Corbett Davis was selected as the team's most valuable player and also won the Chicago Tribune Silver Football as the most valuable player in the Big Ten Conference.

Schedule

1938 NFL draftees

References

Indiana
Indiana Hoosiers football seasons
Indiana Hoosiers football